Millerton is a census-designated place in Jackson Township, Tioga County, Pennsylvania, United States with the ZIP code 16936.  It is located in far northeastern Tioga County, a few miles from the New York border.  The community is situated along Pennsylvania Route 328.  As of the 2010 census, the population was 316 residents.

Demographics

References

Census-designated places in Tioga County, Pennsylvania
Census-designated places in Pennsylvania